Brian Demond Waters (born February 18, 1977) is a former American football guard. He was signed by the Dallas Cowboys as an undrafted free agent in 1999 out of the University of North Texas. He played most of his career for the Kansas City Chiefs, and also played for the New England Patriots. He earned six Pro Bowl selections during his career.

Early years
Waters was born in Waxahachie, Texas, and attended Waxahachie High School. He lettered in football. As a senior, he was an All-District honoree as both a tight end and defensive end. He made 16 receptions for 380 yards on offense, and made five sacks and 66 tackles on defense.

College career
Waters attended the University of North Texas where he played for the North Texas Mean Green football team.  He started his first three years at tight end, while recording 86 receptions for 975 yards and nine touchdowns. As a senior, he was moved to defensive end, but also played as a backup fullback and tight end. On defense, he had 45 tackles (32 solo) and 5 sacks.

Professional career

Dallas Cowboys (first stint)
The Dallas Cowboys signed him as an undrafted free agent after the 1999 NFL draft to play tight end and fullback. He was released during training camp.

Kansas City Chiefs
The Kansas City Chiefs signed him as a free agent during the 2000 offseason and sent him to play with the Berlin Thunder in NFL Europe, with the plan of converting him to center.

Waters was named an All-Pro twice and was selected to the Pro Bowl five times in his 11-year career with the Kansas City Chiefs. In 2003, he was a part of a 13-3 Chiefs team. During the 2004 season, Waters was selected as the AFC Offensive Player of the Week for his play during a game against the Atlanta Falcons on October 24, 2004.  The Chiefs scored an NFL-record eight rushing touchdowns during that game.  Waters is the only offensive lineman in the AFC to have received the award, and the only lineman in the NFL to win since 1992. Waters was recognized as the recipient of the 2009 Walter Payton Man of the Year Award which honors a player's contribution on the field as well as off.

After 11 seasons in Kansas City, he was released on July 28, 2011.

New England Patriots
On September 4, 2011, Waters signed with the New England Patriots. Waters, who started every game at right guard for the Patriots, was voted a starter for the Pro Bowl. After never having won a playoff game before the 2011 season, Waters played for the Patriots in Super Bowl XLVI. Prior to the start of the 2012 season, Waters refused to report to the Patriots. Waters said that if he were to play in 2012, it would be for a team close to his family in Texas. The Patriots finally released Waters from his contract on April 30, 2013.

Dallas Cowboys (second stint)
The Dallas Cowboys signed Waters to a one-year contract worth $3 million on September 3, 2013.

Retirement
Waters announced his retirement on September 2, 2014.

References

External links
New England Patriots bio

1977 births
Living people
American football offensive guards
African-American players of American football
People from Waxahachie, Texas
Waxahachie High School alumni
Players of American football from Texas
North Texas Mean Green football players
Berlin Thunder players
Dallas Cowboys players
Kansas City Chiefs players
New England Patriots players
American Conference Pro Bowl players
21st-century African-American sportspeople
20th-century African-American sportspeople